Ab Barik (also Romanized as Āb Bārīk) is a village in Behnamvasat-e Jonubi Rural District of Javadabad District of Varamin County, Tehran province, Iran. At the 2006 National Census, its population was 1,755 in 429 households. The following census in 2011 counted 2,007 people in 500 households. The latest census in 2016 showed a population of 2,034 people in 613 households; it was the largest village in its rural district.

References 

Varamin County

Populated places in Tehran Province

Populated places in Varamin County